Ray Perez (January 25, 1939 – March 12, 2013) was an American professional boxer who competed from 1958 to 1970. As an amateur, he competed in the men's flyweight event at the 1956 Summer Olympics. He was also the National AAU flyweight champion in 1958.

References

External links
 
 

1939 births
2013 deaths
American male boxers
Olympic boxers of the United States
Boxers at the 1956 Summer Olympics
Boxers from Hawaii
Sportspeople from Honolulu
Flyweight boxers
Bantamweight boxers
Featherweight boxers